The 57th Troop Command is a brigade level administrative formation of the New Jersey Army National Guard.

It supervises independent battalions or battalions affiliated with out-of-state higher headquarters.

Structure

 21st Civil Support Team at Fort Dix
1st Battalion (Assault Helicopter), 150th Aviation Regiment at Lakehurst
Company C, 1st Battalion (Security and Support), 224th Aviation Regiment at West Trenton Armory

References 

Troop Commands of the United States Army National Guard